The 1958–59 Iraq Central FA First Division Cup was the 11th season of the Iraq Central FA League (the top division of football in Baghdad and its neighbouring cities from 1948 to 1973). It was played as a double-elimination tournament.

Amanat Al-Asima won their first title by beating Al-Athori 1–0 in the final which was ended at half-time due to the withdrawal of Al-Athori's players.

Name changes
Al-Kuliya Al-Askariya Al-Malakiya renamed to Al-Kuliya Al-Askariya.
Al-Quwa Al-Jawiya Al-Malakiya renamed to Al-Quwa Al-Jawiya.

Final positions

First round

Second round

Winners bracket

Losers bracket

The match was ended 30 minutes early after the referee refused to continue officiating the game following an argument with Al-Kuliya Al-Askariya player Abed Razzoki
Al-Kuliya Al-Askariya eliminated

Al-Quwa Al-Jawiya eliminated

Al-Numan eliminated (results not available)

Third round

Losers bracket

Al-Filiya eliminated

Maslahat Naqil Al-Rukab eliminated

Al-Liwa Al-Thamin eliminated

Al-Adhamiya eliminated (results not available)

Semi-finals

Winners bracket

Losers bracket

Montakhab Al-Shorta eliminated

Al-Sikak Al-Hadeed eliminated

Final
The match was ended at half-time after Al-Athori players left the field in the 40th minute following the referee's decision to award Amanat Al-Asima a penalty, which they subsequently kicked into an empty net. Al-Athori players claimed that they had left the field due to the referee's refusal to deal with the behaviour of Amanat Al-Asima's fans rather than due to his awarding of a penalty kick. Al-Athori's captain Sarkis Shamson was suspended for six months following the incident, while forward Ammo Baba and goalkeeper Yacoub Yousef were given warnings and the club's sports secretary Youil George Baba was suspended for one year.

References

External links
 Iraqi Football Website

Iraq Central FA League seasons
Iraq
1958 in Iraqi sport
1959 in Iraqi sport